Forbidden Daughters is a 1927 American silent black & white short erotic-drama film directed by prominent nude photographer Albert Arthur Allen. This is the only known movie directed by Allen who, otherwise, was famous by his work as a photographer of nude female models.

Plot
Alva receives news from her long-lost husband, Russell, and goes to Africa in search of him. There, she finds that her husband is being "held prisoner" by a naked native princess, called Loma. Now, in order to bring Russell back home, Alva must show that she's better than the princess.

Cast
 Clarice Conwell
 Gladys DeLores
 Kathryn Kay
 Ralph O'Brien

References

External links
 

1927 films
American silent films
American erotic drama films
American drama short films
American black-and-white films
1920s American films
Silent American drama films